Anastasiia Valeryevna Galashina (born 3 February 1997) is a Russian sport shooter.

Her first major international achievement was a bronze medal at the 2018 ISSF World Shooting Championships.

On the 2020 Olympics, held in 2021, she won a silver medal in the 10 metre air rifle. In the qualification, she was the eighth, the last position which still let her to qualify for the finals. In the final, she was leading before the last shot, however, in the end earned second place, winning the first 2020 Olympic medal for the ROC. 

Galashina took up shooting at age 12. She is married to Eduard Zulfugarov.

References

External links

1997 births
Russian female sport shooters
Living people
ISSF rifle shooters
Shooters at the 2019 European Games
European Games silver medalists for Russia
European Games medalists in shooting
Medalists at the 2020 Summer Olympics
Olympic silver medalists for the Russian Olympic Committee athletes
Olympic shooters of Russia
Shooters at the 2020 Summer Olympics
Olympic medalists in shooting
Sportspeople from Yaroslavl
21st-century Russian women